M94 or M-94 may refer to:

 Messier 94, a spiral galaxy in the constellation Canes Venatici
 M-94 (Michigan highway), a state highway in Michigan
 M-94, a cryptographic device